This is a sortable table of the approximately 1,325 townlands in County Sligo, Ireland.

Duplicate names occur where there is more than one townland with the same name in the county. Names marked in bold typeface are towns and villages, and the word Town appears for those entries in the Acres column.

Townland list

References

External links
 Townlands in Sligo from OpenStreetMap

 
Sligo
Sligo
Townlands